The following is a list of notable deaths in December 2015.

Entries for each day are listed alphabetically by surname. A typical entry lists information in the following sequence:
Name, age, country of citizenship and reason for notability, established cause of death, reference.

December 2015

1
Edwar al-Kharrat, 89, Egyptian novelist, pneumonia.
Rob Blokzijl, 72, Dutch physicist and computer scientist.
Marc Breslow, 90, American game show director (The Price is Right, Match Game, Family Feud).
Joseph Engelberger, 90, American engineer and inventor.
Leoni Franco, 73, Uruguayan musician, composer and guitarist.
Robert E. Glennen, 82, American academic, President of Emporia State University (1985–1997).
Shirley Gunter, 81, American R&B singer.
John F. Kurtzke, 89, American neurologist.
Jim Loscutoff, 85, American basketball player (Boston Celtics), NBA champion (1957, 1959–1964), complications of pneumonia and Parkinson's disease.
Trevor Obst, 75, Australian football player (Port Adelaide).
Xavier Olea Muñoz, 92, Mexican lawyer and politician, Governor of Guerrero (1975).
Marjorie Oludhe Macgoye, 87, English-born Kenyan writer.
V. Ramachandran, 84, Indian civil servant.
Antonio Troyo Calderón, 92, Costa Rican Roman Catholic prelate, Auxiliary Bishop of San José de Costa Rica (1979–2002).

2
Sandy Berger, 70, American political consultant, United States National Security Advisor (1997–2001), cancer.
Theodor Borchgrevink, 92, Norwegian civil engineer.
Bryony Brind, 55, English ballerina, heart attack. 
John Eaton, 81, American composer, brain hemorrhage. 
Gabriele Ferzetti, 90, Italian actor (L'Avventura, On Her Majesty's Secret Service, Once Upon a Time in the West).
Ray Gandolf, 85, American sportscaster.
Shelby Highsmith, 86, American federal judge, adrenal cancer.
Sam Ibiam, 90, Nigerian footballer (national team).
Portia James, 62, American curator and historian.
Ferenc Juhász, 87, Hungarian poet.
Wim Kolijn, 71, Dutch politician.
Ernst Larsen, 89, Norwegian runner, Olympic bronze medalist (1956).
Bob Martyn, 85, American baseball player (Kansas City Athletics).
Will McMillan, 71, American actor (General Hospital, The Crazies), producer, and director.
Joan L. Mitchell, 68, American computer scientist, co-inventor of JPEG.
Sir John Osborn, 92, British politician, Member of Parliament for Sheffield Hallam (1959–1987).
M. A. M. Ramaswamy, 84, Indian industrialist and politician.
John Rassias, 90, American language professor.
Wally Roker, 78, American R&B singer and music executive, complications following brain surgery.
George T. Sakato, 94, American soldier, Medal of Honor recipient.
A. Sheriff, 74, Indian screenwriter (Avalude Ravukal).
Thom Thomas, 80, American playwright, leukemia.
Anthony Valentine, 76, British actor (Colditz, Coronation Street, Escape to Athena), Parkinson's disease.
Luz Marina Zuluaga, 77, Colombian beauty queen, Miss Universe (1958).
Perpetrators of the 2015 San Bernardino attack shot dead by police:
Syed Rizwan Farook, 28, American.
Tashfeen Malik, 29, Pakistani.

3
Omar Ali, 76, Bangladeshi poet.
Gladstone Anderson, 81, Jamaican musician.
Willie Burden, 64, Canadian football player (Calgary Stampeders) and sports administrator.
Roy Evans, 84, Welsh trade union leader.
Sunil Hettiarachchi, 78, Sri Lankan actor.
Eevi Huttunen, 93, Finnish speed skater, world champion (1951, 1953, 1954, 1957, 1959), Olympic bronze medalist (1960).
Lawrence Pugh, 82, American businessman, chief executive of VF Corporation.
*Shared Belief, 4, American racehorse, colic.
Arthur R. Taylor, 80, American businessman, president of CBS.
Scott Weiland, 48, American musician (Stone Temple Pilots, Velvet Revolver, The Wondergirls), accidental drug and alcohol overdose.
Howard West, 84, American television producer (Seinfeld).
Melvin Williams, 73, American drug trafficker and actor (The Wire), cancer.
Michael Wilson, 75, New Zealand cricketer.

4
Jaime Camino, 79, Spanish film director (The Long Winter, Lights and Shadows).
Erik De Vlaeminck, 70, Belgian cyclist, seven-time world-champion cyclo-cross (1966, 1968–1973).
Norman Engleback, 88, British architect.
John Glad, 73, American academic and translator.
Ricardo Guízar Díaz, 82, Mexican Roman Catholic prelate, Archbishop of Tlalnepantla (1996–2009).
Henry Hall, 87, British physicist.
Robert Loggia, 85, American actor (Jagged Edge, Scarface, Big), complications from Alzheimer's disease.
Rodney Milnes, 79, British opera critic.
Karen Montgomery, 66, American actress and film producer, breast cancer.
Irakli Ochiauri, 91, Georgian sculptor.
Takamasa Sakurai, 49, Japanese author and popular culture expert, proponent of anime for cultural exchange, hit by train.
Yossi Sarid, 75, Israeli politician, member of Knesset (1974–2006), Minister of Environment (1992–1996) and Education (1999–2000).
Dmitry Shumkov, 43, Russian lawyer and investor, asphyxiation.
Dag Skogheim, 87, Norwegian writer.
Lajos Takács, 91, Hungarian mathematician.
Xu Ming, 44, Chinese entrepreneur and billionaire.

5
Zafar Altaf, 74, Pakistani cricketer, administrator and civil servant, heart attack.
Willie Coburn, 74, Scottish footballer (St Johnstone).
Peter Cochrane, 96, Scottish World War II army officer.
Luigi Conti, 86, Italian-born Vatican diplomat, Apostolic nuncio (1975–2003).
Ray Crooke, 93, Australian artist, winner of the Archibald Prize (1969).
Kiki Divaris, 90, Greek fashion designer, complications from pneumonia.
Vic Eliason, 79, American Christian broadcaster, cancer.
Marty Feldman, 93, American football coach (Oakland Raiders) and Marine.
Markku Häkkinen, 69, Finnish botanist.
Yolande Henderson, 81, Pakistani teacher, intestinal cancer.
William McIlvanney, 79, Scottish novelist and poet.
Hack Meyers, 41, American professional wrestler (ECW), complications from brain surgery.
Marília Pêra, 72, Brazilian actress (Pixote, Better Days Ahead), lung cancer.
Dimitar Iliev Popov, 88, Bulgarian politician, Prime Minister (1990–1991).
Tibor Rubin, 86, Hungarian-born American Medal of Honor recipient and Holocaust survivor.
Wolfgang Sandner, 66, German physicist.
Siddhi Savetsila, 96, Thai politician, Minister of Foreign Affairs (1980–1990), Deputy Prime Minister (1986).
Dave Scholz, 67, American basketball player (Philadelphia 76ers).
Horst Schuldes, 76, German Olympic ice hockey player (1960), (1964).
Franz Speta, 74, Austrian botanist.
Chuck Williams, 100, American business executive and author, founder of Williams Sonoma.
Bruce Yorke, 91, Canadian politician.

6
Dale Anderson, 83, Canadian ice hockey player (Detroit Red Wings).
Ken Beatrice, 72, American radio personality (WMAL, WTEM), complications from pneumonia.
Ian Burns, 76, Scottish footballer (Aberdeen).
Max Hauri, 73, Swiss Olympic equestrian.
Mack Herron, 67, American football player (Winnipeg Blue Bombers, New England Patriots).
Ko Chun-hsiung, 70, Taiwanese actor (Eight Hundred Heroes, Attack Force Z), director and politician, member of the Legislative Yuan (2005–2008), lung cancer.
Franzl Lang, 84, German yodeler.
Liu Juying, 98, Chinese politician and army general.
Mariuccia Mandelli, 90, Italian fashion designer, founder of Krizia.
Mike Mangold, 60, American commercial and aerobatics pilot, world champion (2005, 2007), plane crash.
Mick McLaughlin, 72, Welsh footballer (Hereford United, Newport County).
John L. Myers, 68, American politician.
Jaafar Mohammed Saad, Yemeni politician and general, Governor of Aden (since 2015), car bombing.
Georg Smefjell, 78, Norwegian Olympic ice hockey player (1964), (1968).
Nicholas Smith, 81, British actor (Are You Being Served?, Wallace & Gromit: The Curse of the Were-Rabbit, Doctor Who), complications from a fall.
Zoltán Szabó, 86, Hungarian cardiac surgeon, performed nation's first successful heart transplant.
Tomi Taira, 87, Japanese actress, respiratory failure.
Holly Woodlawn, 69, Puerto Rican-born American actress and Warhol superstar, brain and liver cancer.
Wu Te-mei, 68, Taiwanese politician, MLY (1984–1996), kidney failure caused by diabetes.

7
Betty Bourke, 91, New Zealand health administrator.
Martin E. Brooks, 90, American actor (The Six Million Dollar Man, The Bionic Woman, Dallas).
Lolita Aniyar de Castro, 78, Venezuelan politician.
Horn Chen, 83, American businessman.
Heinz Fricke, 88, German conductor and music director.
Hoàng Hà Giang, 24, Vietnamese Taekwondo athlete, silver medalist at the 2006 Asian Games.
Gerhard Lenski, 91, American sociologist.
Rrok Mirdita, 76, Montenegrin-born Albanian Roman Catholic prelate, Archbishop of Tiranë-Durrës (since 1992).
Virginia A. Myers, 88, American artist, professor and printmaker.
Kenneth Partridge, 89, English interior decorator.
Elaine Riley, 98, American actress.
Hyron Spinrad, 81, American astronomer.
Shirley Stelfox, 74, British actress (Emmerdale, Keeping Up Appearances, Coronation Street), cancer.
Jennifer Taylor, 80, Australian architect and academic.
Peter Westbury, 77, British racing driver.

8
Mattiwilda Dobbs, 90, American coloratura soprano, cancer.
Gus Gil, 76, Venezuelan baseball player (Cleveland Indians, Milwaukee Brewers, Seattle Pilots).
Alan Hodgkinson, 79, English footballer (Sheffield United, national team).
Derek Hyatt, 84, English landscape painter.
Bonnie Lou, 91, American country singer, dementia.
Gary Marker, 72, American bassist (Rising Sons, Captain Beefheart and his Magic Band) and recording engineer, stroke.
Johnny More, 81, English impressionist, leukaemia.
J. Hugh Nichols, 85, American politician.
Anthony Francis Sharma, 77, Nepalese Roman Catholic prelate, Vicar Apostolic of Nepal (1984–2014).
Jokelyn Tienstra, 45, Dutch handball player, brain tumor.
Douglas Tompkins, 72, American conservationist and businessman, co-founder of The North Face and Esprit, hypothermia following kayak accident.
Ross Turnbull, 81, Canadian-born American ice hockey player (Philadelphia Ramblers).
John Trudell, 69, American Indian activist and poet, cancer.
Elsie Tu, 102, English-born Hong Kong social activist, member of the Legislative Council of Hong Kong (1988–1995).
Ramashankar Yadav, 58, Indian poet and activist.

9
Soshana Afroyim, 88, Austrian painter.
Norman Breslow, 74, American statistician and medical researcher, prostate cancer.
John Cockerton, 88, British Anglican priest and academic.
Carlo Furno, 94, Italian Roman Catholic prelate, Cardinal (since 1994) and Apostolic nuncio (1973–1995).
Robert Grant, 67, American politician, member of the Kansas House of Representatives (1991–1994, 1997–2013).
Gheorghe Gruia, 75, Romanian handball player, world champion (1964, 1970), Olympic bronze medalist (1972).
Rusty Jones, 73, American jazz drummer.
Juvenal Juvêncio, 81, Brazilian lawyer and sports director.
Akiyuki Nosaka, 85, Japanese novelist (Grave of the Fireflies).
Igino Rizzi, 91, Italian Olympic ski jumper.
Henry Rowan, 92, American philanthropist and engineer.
Matthew Shija, 91, Tanzanian Roman Catholic prelate, Bishop of Kahama (1983–2001).
Julio Terrazas Sandoval, 79, Bolivian Roman Catholic prelate, Cardinal (since 2001) and Archbishop of Santa Cruz de la Sierra (1991–2013).
Jenny Wormald, 73, Scottish historian.

10
Klaus Baumgartner, 77, Swiss politician.
Ian Bell, 59, Scottish journalist and author.
Rainer Bloss, 69, German electronic musician (Drive Inn).
Ron Bouchard, 67, American NASCAR driver, cancer.
Walter Fawcett, 86, Northern Irish cricketer.
Maurice Graham, 83, Australian rugby union player (New South Wales, New Zealand).
Denis Héroux, 75, Canadian film director and producer.
Dermot Patrick O'Mahony, 80, Irish Roman Catholic prelate, Auxiliary Bishop of Dublin (1975–1996).
Arnold Peralta, 26, Honduran footballer (national team, Rangers F.C.), shot.
Desmond Robinson, 87, British Olympic cyclist.
Dolph Schayes, 87, American Hall of Fame basketball player and coach (Philadelphia 76ers), NBA champion (1955), cancer.
Barry Schweid, 83, American news correspondent (Associated Press), neurological disease.
Donald J. Stohr, 81, American federal judge, U.S. District Court Judge for the Eastern District of Missouri (1992–2006).

11
Mihai Adam, 75, Romanian footballer.
Harry Butler, 85, Australian naturalist and conservationist, cancer.
Samir Chakrabarti, 72, Indian cricketer.
Steve Chimombo, 70, Malawian writer.
Lloyd Dane, 90, American racing driver.
Neville De Souza, 87, Jamaican religious figure, Bishop of Jamaica and the Cayman Islands (1979–2000).
Jake Howard, 70, Australian rugby union player (national team).
Igor Kashintsev, 83, Soviet and Russian actor.
Abish Kekilbayev, 76, Kazakh politician and academic.
Sir Roderick McSween, 80, Scottish pathologist.
Altaff Mungrue, 81, Trinidadian-born English cricketer.
Jiří Paďour, 72, Czech Roman Catholic prelate, Bishop of České Budějovice (2002–2014).
Gaston Salvatore, 74, Chilean writer.
H. Arnold Steinberg, 82, Canadian business and educational administrator, Chancellor of McGill University (2009–2014).
Hema Upadhyay, 43, Indian artist, bludgeoned.
John "Hot Rod" Williams, 53, American basketball player (Cleveland Cavaliers, Phoenix Suns), prostate cancer.
Zyx, 65, Canadian cartoonist and publisher (Croc).

12
Luis Bermejo, 84, Spanish cartoonist and illustrator.
Terry Bledsoe, 81, American football executive and sportswriter.
Ignacio Carrau, 92, Spanish politician and lawyer.
Jon Gadsby, 62, British-born New Zealand writer and comedian (A Week of It), cancer.
Gösta Gärdin, 92, Swedish modern pentathlete, Olympic bronze medalist (1948).
Frans Geurtsen, 73, Dutch footballer (DWS, national team).
Sir Peter Gregson, 79, British civil servant.
Ken Johnson, 87, British Olympic steeplechase athlete (1952).
Sharad Anantrao Joshi, 80, Indian politician and social activist, prostate cancer.
Federico Kirbus, 84, Argentine author.
Evelyn S. Lieberman, 71, American public affairs professional, White House Deputy Chief of Staff (1996), pancreatic cancer.
I. Howard Marshall, 81, Scottish theologian, pancreatic cancer.
Yuri Marushkin, 71, Russian football player and manager.
Gene Ready, 74, American politician, member of the Florida House of Representatives (1977–1984), cancer.
John Scott-Scott, 81, British aerospace engineer.
Rose Siggins, 43, American actress (American Horror Story), infection.
Yashpal Singh, 94, Indian politician
Gregory Baker Wolfe, 93, American diplomat and academic.

13
Benedict Anderson, 79, American academic and writer (Imagined Communities), heart failure.
John Bannon, 72, Australian politician, Premier of South Australia (1982–1992), cancer.
Albert Bontridder, 94, Belgian architect and writer.
Luigi Creatore, 93, American songwriter and record producer, pneumonia.
James Gillies, 91, Canadian politician.
Marleen de Pater-van der Meer, 65, Dutch politician, member of the House of Representatives (2001–2010).
Phil Pepe, 80, American sportswriter, heart attack.
Gretchen Quie, 88, American artist, First Lady of Minnesota (1979–1983), restored the Minnesota Governor's Residence, Parkinson's disease.
Peter Ryan, 92, Australian newspaper columnist.
Ed Sharkey, 88, American football player (Philadelphia Eagles, San Francisco 49ers, BC Lions).
Donald Weinstein, 89, American historian.

14
Terry Backer, 61, American politician, member of the Connecticut House of Representatives (since 1993), brain cancer.
Sian Blake, 43, British actress (EastEnders), stabbed.
Armando Cossutta, 89, Italian politician, member of the European Parliament (1999–2004).
Johnny Egan, 76, Irish Gaelic football player (Offaly).
Kathryn H. Kidd, 65, American author.
Herbert Kiesel, 84, Swiss bobsledder.
Joe Lancaster, 89, English football player and trainer.
Edmund Lyndeck, 90, American singer and actor (Big Daddy, Enchanted, Road Trip).
*Scat Daddy, 11, American Thoroughbred racehorse.
Leander J. Shaw Jr., 85, American politician, Chief Justice of Florida Supreme Court (1990–1992).
Glen Sonmor, 86, Canadian ice hockey player (New York Rangers) and head coach (Minnesota North Stars), pneumonia.
Mick Twomey, 84, Australian football player (Collingwood).
Vadym Tyshchenko, 52, Ukrainian football player (Karpaty, Dnipro) and manager (Dnipro), Olympic champion (1988).
Lillian Vernon, 88, German-born American businesswoman, founder of Lillian Vernon.
Aleš Veselý, 80, Czech sculptor.

15
Tom Arden, 54, Australian-born British author, cancer.
Milton Ballantyne, 87, Australian politician, member of the Northern Territory Legislative Assembly (1974–1980).
André Bernard, 85, French cyclist.
Stella Doufexis, 47, German mezzo-soprano, cancer.
Licio Gelli, 96, Italian financier, Venerable Master of the Propaganda Due lodge.
Charles C. Lanham, 87, American politician, member of West Virginia Senate.
Ken Pogue, 81, Canadian actor (The 6th Day, The Dead Zone, Millennium), cancer.
Kathy Secker, 70, British television presenter.
Harry Zvi Tabor, 98, British-born Israeli physicist.
H. Paul Varley, 84, American historian.

16
Noboru Ando, 89, Japanese actor and yakuza.
Svein Bakke, 62, Norwegian footballer (Sogndal).
John Bates, 77, American college basketball coach (Maryland Eastern Shore, Coppin State), heart attack.
Peter Dickinson, 88, British author (Tulku, The Flight of Dragons, City of Gold).
Khodadad Mirza Farman Farmaian, 87, Iranian Qajar dynasty royal and banker.
Gabre Gabric, 101, Croatian-born Italian Olympic track and field athlete (1936), (1948).
Snuff Garrett, 76, American record producer, cancer.
Aafje Heynis, 91, Dutch contralto.
Brian Keeble, 77, English footballer (Grimsby Town, Darlington).
Bob Krause, 70, American college athletic director (Kansas State University), cancer.
Heinz-Otto Kreiss, 85, German-born Swedish mathematician.
Lizmark, 64, Mexican professional wrestler, respiratory failure.
Jim McAnany, 79, American baseball player (Chicago White Sox, Chicago Cubs).
Anthony Muto, 81, American fashion designer, heart failure.
Zoulikha Nasri, 70, Moroccan politician, Secretary of State for National Cooperation (1997–1998).
George Earl Ortman, 89, American artist.
Ray Price, 78, American motorcycle builder and racer.
René Saorgin, 87, French organist.
Ilie Savel, 88, Romanian Olympic hurdler.
Harry Scott, 78, British boxer.
Joseph Tellechéa, 89, French footballer.
Enoch Thorsgard, 98, American politician.

17
Hal Brown, 91, American baseball player (Boston Red Sox, Baltimore Orioles, Houston Colt .45s).
Serge Devèze, 59, French football manager.
Zaevion Dobson, 15, American football player, shot.
Börje Grönroos, 86, Finnish Olympic boxer.
Osamu Hayaishi, 95, Japanese biochemist.
Buckshot Hoffner, 91, American politician.
Vladimir Kostyukov, 61, Belarusian football coach and player (Dnepr Mogilev).
Kamal Ahmed Rizvi, 85, Pakistani actor and writer, heart attack.
Joseph Roduit, 76, Swiss Roman Catholic prelate, Abbot of Saint-Maurice d'Agaune (1999–2015).
Michael Wyschogrod, 87, German-born American Jewish theologian.

18
Luc Brewaeys, 56, Belgian composer and musician, cancer.
Florentino Broce, 72, Filipino football player and coach.
Slobodan Čašule, 70, Macedonian politician, Minister of Foreign Affairs (2001–2002).
Yūzan Fujita, 66, Japanese politician, Governor of Hiroshima Prefecture (1993–2009).
Carl Furlonge, 83, Trinidadian cricketer.
Joe Gilmore, 93, British barman.
Evelio Hernández, 84, Cuban baseball player (Washington Senators).
Vittore Gottardi, 74, Swiss footballer.
Stuart Milton Hodgson, 91, Canadian politician, Commissioner of the Northwest Territories (1967–1979).
Martin Jære, 95, Norwegian Olympic skier (1948).
Daifallah Masadeh, 76–77, Jordanian politician, State Minister for Legal Affairs (2000–2001).
Léon Mébiame, 81, Gabonese politician, Prime Minister (1975–1990).
Howell W. Melton, 92, American lawyer and judge.
Placidus Nkalanga, 96, Tanzanian Roman Catholic prelate, Bishop of Bukoba (1969–1973).
Phil Oestricher, 84, American test pilot.
Andreja Preger, 104, Hungarian-born Serbian pianist and Holocaust survivor.
Mogens Rukov, 72, Danish screenwriter.
Jesús Samper, 65, Spanish businessman, owner of Real Murcia (since 2001).
Helge Solum Larsen, 46, Norwegian politician, deputy leader of Venstre (2010–2012), aneurysm.
Jean-Luc Vilmouth, 63, French artist.

19
Bets Borm-Luijkx, 97, Dutch politician, member of the House of Representatives (1980–1981).
Peter Broggs, 61, Jamaican reggae musician.
Douglas Dick, 95, American actor (Rope, Perry Mason).
Louis DiGiaimo, 77, American casting director (The Godfather, Homicide: Life on the Street) and film producer (Donnie Brasco), stroke.
Maurice Grace, 86, Australian Olympic rower.
Chris Harris, 67, American politician, member of the Texas House of Representatives (1985–1991) and Senate (1991–2013).
Jimmy Hill, 87, English footballer (Fulham) and manager (Coventry City), trade union leader (PFA) and TV presenter (Match of the Day), Alzheimer's disease.
Harry Hyams, 87, British property developer (Centre Point).
Greville Janner, 87, British politician, MP for Leicester North West (1970–1974) and Leicester West (1974–1997), Alzheimer's disease.
Stephen Jelicich, 92, Croatian-born New Zealand architect.
Mabuni Kenei, 97, Japanese martial arts expert.
Samir Kuntar, 53, Lebanese convicted murderer, member of Hezbollah, longest-held Lebanese prisoner in Israel, missile strike.
Alan Lee, 61, British cricket and horse racing journalist.
*Madame Claude, 92, French procurer.
Kurt Masur, 88, German conductor, Parkinson's disease.
Dickie Moore, 84, Canadian Hall of Fame ice hockey player (Montreal Canadiens), Stanley Cup winner (1953, 1956–1960), prostate cancer.
Carlos Païta, 83, Argentine conductor.
Ranganath, 66, Indian Telugu actor, suicide by hanging.
Selma Reis, 55, Brazilian actress and singer, brain cancer.
Ozell Sutton, 90, American civil rights activist.
Karin Söder, 87, Swedish politician, leader of the Centre Party (1985–1987), Minister for Health and Social Affairs (1979–1982), Minister for Foreign Affairs (1976–1978).
Dick Wathika, 42, Kenyan politician, Mayor of Nairobi (2004–2008).

20
Aldo Baito, 95, Italian cyclist.
George Burpo, 93, American baseball player (Cincinnati Reds).
Rudi Ceyssens, 53, Belgian Olympic cyclist.
Patricia Elliott, 77, American actress (A Little Night Music, One Life to Live), Tony Award winner (1973), leiomyosarcoma.
Gevorg Geodakyan, 87, Armenian musicologist.
Robert Hayling, 86, American civil rights activist.
Alain Jouffroy, 87, French surrealist poet and art critic.
Ray Mathews, 86, American football player (Pittsburgh Steelers).
Angela McEwan, 81, American actress (Nebraska, Getting On), lung cancer.
Wayne Robinson, 85, American football player (Philadelphia Eagles).
Kjell Bloch Sandved, 93, Norwegian-born American author and nature photographer.
Jim West, 61, Australian boxer, national flyweight/super featherweight and Commonwealth flyweight champion.

21
Rimma Bilunova, 75, Russian chess player and coach.
Dejan Brđović, 49, Serbian volleyball player, Olympic bronze medalist (1996).
Abune Dioskoros, 80, Eritrean prelate, Patriarch of the Eritrean Orthodox Tewahedo Church (since 2007).
Sam Dockery, 86, American jazz pianist.
David Emms, 90, British educationalist.
Timothy Foote, 89, American editor and writer.
Jan Góra, 67, Polish Roman Catholic Dominican priest.
*Jupiter Apple, 47, Brazilian singer-songwriter and multi-instrumentalist (TNT, Os Cascavelletes), multiple organ failure.
Vilgot Larsson, 83, Swedish Olympic ice hockey player (1956), (Leksands IF), world champion (1957).
Richelieu Levoyer, 85, Ecuadorian army general and politician.
*Lim Eng Beng, 64, Filipino basketball player, liver cancer.
Bob Suci, 76, American football player (Houston Oilers, Boston Patriots).
Andrei Troschinsky, 37, Kazakhstani ice hockey player, Asian champion (1999), heart attack.
Ernesto Mayz Vallenilla, 90, Venezuelan philosopher.
Emmanuel Yarbrough, 51, American mixed martial artist.

22
Arlin Adams, 94, American judge.
Rolf Bossi, 92, German lawyer.
Carol Burns, 68, Australian actress (Prisoner), cancer.
Daisy Elliott, 98, American politician and realtor.
Derek Ezra, Baron Ezra, 96, British coal industry administrator, Chairman of the National Coal Board (1971–1982).
Nabil Al Fadl, 66, Kuwaiti politician.
Billy Glaze, 72, American serial killer, lung cancer.
Marijane Landis, 87, American broadcaster and television host (WGAL-TV).
Joseph Leopold Imesch, 84, American Roman Catholic prelate, Bishop of Joliet (1979–2006).
José Jhonson, 76, Ecuadorian footballer.
Peter Lundblad, 65, Swedish singer ("Ta mig till havet"), prostate cancer.
V. S. Malimath, 86, Indian judge, Chief Justice of Karnataka (1984) and Kerala (1985–1991).
Riley Martin, 69, American author and radio host.
Brooke McCarter, 52, American model and actor (The Lost Boys, Thrashin', Wired), alpha 1-antitrypsin deficiency.
Freda Meissner-Blau, 88, Austrian politician, founder of The Greens – The Green Alternative.
Carson Van Osten, 70, American artist, Disney Legend.

23
Hocine Aït Ahmed, 89, Algerian politician, founder and leader of Socialist Forces Front.
Carlos Cano, 60, Peruvian actor, cancer.
Chen Luyun, 38, Chinese basketball player, colon cancer.
Henry Crichton, 6th Earl Erne, 78, British peer.
Michael Earl, 56, American puppeteer (Sesame Street, Dinosaurs, Team America: World Police), colon cancer.
Alfred G. Gilman, 74, American pharmacologist and biochemist, Nobel Prize laureate, pancreatic cancer.
Grégoire Haddad, 91, Lebanese Melkite Greek Catholic hierarch, Archbishop of Beirut and Byblos (1968–1975).
Hatidža Hadžiosmanović, 78, Bosnian jurist, President of the Constitutional Court of Bosnia and Herzegovina.
Don Howe, 80, English footballer (West Bromwich Albion, Arsenal, national team) and coach.
Ablie Jagne, 62, Gambian footballer (Real de Banjul, national team).
Joe Jamail, 90, American attorney and billionaire.
Jean-Marie Pelt, 82, French biologist.
Igor Persiantsev, 78, Russian figure skater.
Sławomir Pstrong, 39,  Polish film and television director, screenwriter, and author of short stories.
Taklung Tsetrul Rinpoche, 89, Tibetan lama, Supreme Head of the Nyingma School of Tibetan Buddhism (since 2012).
Susanne Hoeber Rudolph, 85, German-born American political scientist.
Bill Subritzky, 90, New Zealand property developer and evangelist.
Sir Brian Tovey, 89, British civil servant, Director of the Government Communications Headquarters (1978–1983).
Bülent Ulusu, 92, Turkish politician, Prime Minister (1980–1983).

24
Romeo Anaya, 69, Mexican boxer, WBA Bantamweight Champion (1973).
László Bánhegyi, 84, Hungarian Olympic basketball player.
Turid Birkeland, 53, Norwegian politician, Minister of Culture (1996–1997), myelofibrosis.
Jim Carlton, 80, Australian politician, member of the Australian Parliament (1977–1994), Minister for Health (1982–1983).
Suprovat Chakravarty, 86, Indian Olympic cyclist (1952), heart attack.
David C. Clark, 89, American politician.
Michael W. Davidson, 65, American microscopist.
Eugène Dodeigne, 92, Belgian-born French sculptor.
Robert S. Folkenberg, 75, Puerto Rican Seventh-day Adventist leader, President of the General Conference (1990–1999).
Dennis Griffiths, 82, British newspaper executive (Evening Standard) and press historian.
William Guest, 74, American R&B singer (Gladys Knight & the Pips), heart failure.
Mel Holmes, 65, American football player (Pittsburgh Steelers).
Ron Jacobs, 72, American basketball coach (Loyola Marymount University, Northern Cement, Philippine national team), complications from a stroke.
Jin Xiang, 80, Chinese composer and music critic.
Takeharu Kunimoto, 55, Japanese musician, acute respiratory failure.
Letty Jimenez Magsanoc, 74, Filipino journalist (Philippine Daily Inquirer), cardiac arrest.
Adriana Olguín, 104, Chilean lawyer and politician, Minister of Justice (1952).

25
Manuel Agujetas, 76, Spanish flamenco singer.
Zahran Alloush, 44, Syrian rebel commander, founder of Jaysh al-Islam, airstrike.
Sir Clifford Boulton, 85, British public servant, Clerk of the House of Commons (1987–1994)
Ali Eid, 75, Lebanese politician, General Secretary of the Arab Democratic Party (since 1972).
George Evans, 74, Australian rugby league player (St. George).
Karen Friesicke, 53, German comedian and actress, suicide.
Leonid Gofshtein, 62, Israeli chess grandmaster.
Ottavio Jemma, 90, Italian screenwriter.
George Clayton Johnson, 86, American writer (Logan's Run, Ocean's 11, The Twilight Zone), prostate and bladder cancer.
Eric Philpott, 69, Irish Gaelic footballer (Cork).
Ignacio Rupérez, 72, Spanish author and diplomat, Ambassador to Iraq (2005–2008) and Honduras (2009–2010).
Acharya S, 54, American religious author, breast cancer.
Sadhana Shivdasani, 74, Indian film actress (Love in Simla, Woh Kaun Thi, Hum Dono).
Robert Spitzer, 83, American psychiatrist, heart disease.
Jason Wingreen, 95, American actor (Archie Bunker's Place, The Empire Strikes Back, Airplane!).

26
Nasser al-Bahri, 43, Saudi-born Yemeni Islamist militant and bodyguard.
Tony Buffery, 76, British actor, comedian and writer.
Ogwyn Davies, 90, Welsh painter.
Bobby Dews, 76, American baseball player and coach (Atlanta Braves).
Ed Dobson, 65, British-born American theologian, amyotrophic lateral sclerosis.
Ståle Eskeland, 72, Norwegian jurist, cancer.
Robert Austin Larter, 90, Canadian politician.
Emory Melton, 92, American politician, Missouri State Senator (1972–1996).
William O'Callaghan, 94, Irish Army lieutenant general, Force Commander (United Nations Interim Force in Lebanon).
Jim O'Toole, 78, American baseball player (Cincinnati Reds).
Mac Otten, 90, American basketball player (St. Louis Bombers).
Jamie Parsons, 74, American politician, Mayor of Juneau (1991–1994), cancer.
Frank B. Salisbury, 89, American plant physiologist.
Mary Scranton, 97, American community advocate and philanthropist, First Lady of Pennsylvania (1963–1967), Alzheimer's disease.
Marcel Seynaeve, 82, Belgian cyclist.
Tongdaeng, 17, Thai dog, pet of King Bhumibol Adulyadej.
Sten Wickbom, 84, Swedish politician, Governor of Kronoberg County (1988–1995), Minister for Justice (1983–1987).

27
Naji al Jerf, 37, Syrian journalist and filmmaker, shot.
Christopher N. L. Brooke, 88, British medieval historian.
Stein Eriksen, 88, Norwegian alpine skier, Olympic champion (1952) and triple world champion (1954).
Franco Giacobini, 89, Italian actor.
Dave Henderson, 57, American baseball player (Seattle Mariners, Boston Red Sox, Oakland Athletics), World Series champion (1989), heart attack.
Aidan Higgins, 88, Irish writer.
Ellsworth Kelly, 92, American artist.
Meadowlark Lemon, 83, American Hall of Fame basketball player (Harlem Globetrotters).
Sidney Mintz, 93, American anthropologist.
Bill Mullins, 95, Irish horse rider.
Alfredo Pacheco, 33, Salvadoran footballer (FAS, New York Red Bulls, national team), shot.
Carlos Rosales Mendoza, 52, Mexican drug lord, founder of La Familia Michoacana.
Andy M. Stewart, 63, Scottish folk singer (Silly Wizard).
Roy Swinbourne, 86, English footballer (Wolverhampton Wanderers).
Gabriel Tambon, 85, French politician, Mayor of Le Castellet, Var (since 1965).
Brian Turner, 77, English cricketer.
Wilbur Volz, 91, American football player (Buffalo Bills).
Berenado Vunibobo, 83, Fijian politician and diplomat.
Haskell Wexler, 93, American cinematographer and director (Who's Afraid of Virginia Woolf?, One Flew Over the Cuckoo's Nest, Medium Cool), Oscar winner (1966, 1976).
Stevie Wright, 68, English-born Australian singer (The Easybeats).
Youhannes Ezzat Zakaria Badir, 66, Egyptian Coptic Catholic hierarch, Bishop of Ismayliah (1992–1994) and Luqsor (since 1994).

28
Ann Arnold, 79, English artist.
Chris Barnard, 76, South African author, heart attack.
Robert O. Blake, 94, American diplomat, Ambassador to Mali (1970–1973), prostate cancer.
John Bradbury, 62, English drummer (The Specials).
Nancy Randall Clark, 77, American politician.
Rick Cluchey, 82, American playwright.
Bram de Does, 81, Dutch typographer.
Maggie Deahm, 77, Australian politician, member of the Australian House of Representatives for Macquarie (1993–1996).
Guru Josh, 51, Jersey musician, suicide.
Joe Houston, 89, American jazz and R&B saxophonist.
Eloy Inos, 66, Northern Mariana Islands politician, Governor (since 2013), Lieutenant Governor (2009–2013), complications after heart surgery.
Eiji Kimizuka, 63, Japanese general, Chief of Staff Ground Self-Defense Force (2011–2013), lung cancer.
Lemmy, 70, English rock musician (Motörhead, Hawkwind), complications from prostate cancer.
Tiffany Leong, 30, Malaysian actress, liver cancer.
Aura Lewis, 68, South African reggae singer.
Ian Murdock, 42, American software engineer, founder of the Debian Project, suicide by hanging.
Åge Nordkild, 63, Norwegian politician, member of the Sami Parliament (2001–2005, 2009–2013).
Tone Nyhagen, 52, Norwegian dancer.
Volney Peters, 87, American football player (Washington Redskins, Chicago Cardinals, Oakland Raiders).
Landon H. Rowland, 78, American businessman (Kansas City Southern Railway).
Pierre-Marie Rudelle, 83, French painter.
Allen Sapp, 87, Canadian painter.
Sylvester Stein, 95, South African writer and athlete.
Sean Whitesell, 52, American actor and television producer (Cold Case, House, Oz), cancer.

29
Sabino Acquaviva, 88, Italian sociologist.
Billie Allen, 90, American actress, one of the first black performers on U.S. television.
Aslam Azhar, 83, Pakistani television executive.
Wanda Harper Bush, 84, American barrel racer, heart attack.
Tony Carroll, 74, American psychotherapist.
Patrick Curtin, 26, Irish Gaelic footballer (Kerry), head injuries after falling from a vehicle.
Edward Hugh, 67, British economist, gallbladder and liver cancer.
*Kim Yang-gon, 73, North Korean senior politician, traffic collision.
Elżbieta Krzesińska, 81, Polish track and field athlete, Olympic champion (1956).
Om Prakash Malhotra, 93, Indian Army general.
Frank Malzone, 85, American baseball player (Boston Red Sox, California Angels).
Master Blaster, 28–29, Ugandan dancehall musician, shot.
Ed Mayer, 84, American baseball player (Chicago Cubs).
Pavel Srníček, 47, Czech footballer (Newcastle United, national team), European Championship runner-up (1996), complications from heart attack.

30
George Andreadis, 79, Greek author.
Doug Atkins, 85, American football player (Cleveland Browns, Chicago Bears, New Orleans Saints), NFL champion (1954, 1963).
Víctor Santiago Díaz, Puerto Rican politician, cancer.
Howard Davis, Jr., 59, American boxer, Olympic champion (1976), lung cancer.
Chatral Sangye Dorje, 102, Tibetan yogi.
George Elsey, 97, American military adviser.
Mangesh Padgaonkar, 86, Indian poet.
Howard Pawley, 81, Canadian politician, Premier of Manitoba (1981–1988).
Luis Silva Parra, 84, Ecuadorian jazz saxophonist.
Yuhanon Philoxenos, 74, Indian Syriac Orthodox bishop.
Zjef Vanuytsel, 70, Belgian folk and kleinkunst singer.
Fritz Wechselberger, 77, Austrian Olympic ice hockey player (1964).

31
Roman Bartoszcze, 69, Polish politician.
Helen Blatch, 82, British actress, cancer.
Wesley Burrowes, 85, Irish playwright (Glenroe).
Natalie Cole, 65, American Grammy-winning singer ("This Will Be", "Sophisticated Lady", "Inseparable") and actress, heart failure.
Peter J. Costigan, 85, American politician, member of the New York State Assembly (1966–1974).
Bronislav Danda, 85, Czech ice hockey player, bronze medalist at the 1955 World Ice Hockey Championships.
Steve Gohouri, 34, Ivorian footballer (Wigan Athletic, national team). (body found on this date)
Geoffrey Hawthorn, 74, British sociologist.
Beth Howland, 74, American actress (Alice, The Love Boat, Company), lung cancer.
Marion James, 81, American blues singer.
Donal Leahy, 77, Irish footballer (Cork Celtic).
Marvin Panch, 89, American racing driver, natural causes.
Felix Pirani, 87, British theoretical physicist.
Dino Pompanin, 85, Italian Olympic skier.
Vern Rapp, 87, American baseball manager (St. Louis Cardinals, Cincinnati Reds).
Dal Richards, 97, Canadian big band leader, prostate cancer.
Wayne Rogers, 82, American actor (M*A*S*H, Ghosts of Mississippi, House Calls), complications from pneumonia.
Daniel L. Ryan, 85, American Roman Catholic prelate, Bishop of Springfield in Illinois (1983–1999).
Richard Sapper, 83, German industrial designer.
Peter Wight, 85, Guyanese-born English cricketer (Somerset) and umpire.

References

2015-12
12